Clara Honsinger (born June 5, 1997) is an American professional cyclist who currently rides for UCI Women's Continental Team  in road racing, and Cannondale–Cyclocrossworld.com in cyclo-cross.

Career
Honsinger won the 2018 USA Cycling Cyclocross National Championship in the under-23 category held in Louisville, Kentucky. On December 15, 2019, she won the USA Cycling Cyclocross National Championship in the women's elite category. The race was held at Fort Steilacoom Park in Lakewood, Washington. She is the first new USA women's elite category Cyclocross National Champion in 15 years, following the annual victories of Katie Compton since 2004.

For the 2021 road cycling season, Honsinger joined the  team. She combined this with a cyclo-cross schedule, riding for the Cannondale–Cyclocrossworld.com team.

On January 31, 2021, at the élite women's world championship race in Ostend, Belgium, Honsinger placed fourth, 52 seconds behind winner Lucinda Brand of the Netherlands and 33 seconds behind third-placed Denise Betsema, also of the Netherlands.

Personal life
Honsinger lives in Corvallis, Oregon, and is a student at Oregon State University.

Major results

Cyclo-cross

2017–2018
 2nd  Pan American Under-23 Championships
 2nd National Under-23 Championships
 2nd Iowa City
2018–2019
 1st  Pan American Under-23 Championships
 1st  National Under-23 Championships
 US Open
1st Day 1
1st Day 2
2019–2020
 1st  National Championships
 Major Taylor Cross Cup
1st Day 1
1st Day 2
 US Open
1st Day 2
2nd Day 1
 1st Fayetteville
 2nd  Pan American Championships
 UCI World Cup
3rd Iowa City
2020–2021
 UCI World Cup
2nd Namur
2nd Dendermonde
2021–2022
 1st  National Championships
 X²O Badkamers Trophy
1st Koppenberg
 USCX Series
1st Baltimore I
2nd Rochester I
2nd Baltimore II
2nd Rochester II
 UCI World Cup
2nd Dendermonde
3rd Fayetteville
2022–2023
 Coupe de France
1st Nommay I
1st Nommay II
 1st Waterloo

References

External links

1997 births
Living people
American female cyclists
Cyclo-cross cyclists
American cyclo-cross champions
21st-century American women
Cyclists from Oregon